Valeri Georgiyevich Tskhovrebov (born 29 May 1989) is a Russian professional football player.

Club career
He made his Russian Football National League debut for FC Alania Vladikavkaz on 26 July 2009 in a game against FC Volgar-Gazprom Astrakhan.

References

1989 births
People from Prigorodny District, North Ossetia–Alania
Living people
Russian footballers
Association football defenders
FC Spartak Vladikavkaz players
FC Taganrog players
FC Shinnik Yaroslavl players
FC Sibir Novosibirsk players
FC Yenisey Krasnoyarsk players
Sportspeople from North Ossetia–Alania